Campsicnemus curvipes is a species of fly in the family Dolichopodidae. It is distributed in Europe and North Africa.

References

Sympycninae
Insects described in 1823
Diptera of Europe
Diptera of Africa
Taxa named by Carl Fredrik Fallén